Coprosma nitida, the mountain currant or shining currant, is a shrub species endemic to south-east Australia. It is a shrub with small, glossy leaves, occasional spines on the end of its branchlets, and small bright red-orange fruits.

Description 
Coprosma nitida is erect, densely branching shrub in the family Rubiaceae, growing between 1 and 2m high. Leaves are 5-15mm in length, narrow-ovate with a distinct midrib, glossy leaf surface, and entire leaf margin, arranged oppositely on short petioles. The ends of its branchlets are often sharpened. C. nitida is dioecious with single, terminal flowers. These are funnel-shaped, approximately 5mm in diameter, and pale green in colour. Flowering occurs spring through summer followed by red-orange fleshy drupe or ‘fruit’, round and 10mm long.

Habitat & distribution 
The genus Coprosma is found in Australia, New Zealand, the Hawaiian Islands, Borneo, Java, New Guinea, to the Juan Fernández Islands. The species nitida is found exclusively in the south-eastern states Tasmania, some parts of Victoria and New South Wales. C. nitida most commonly occurs in subalpine woodlands between 400 and 1,000m above sea level, in well-drained soils.

References

nitida
Flora of New South Wales
Flora of Victoria (Australia)
Flora of Tasmania
Taxa named by Joseph Dalton Hooker